Felicitas Becker (born 1971 in Erlangen) is a Belgian historian, currently a Professor of African History at the University of Ghent. She worked at the University of Cambridge from 2010 till 2016, where she was also Fellow of Peterhouse College. She works on AIDS, slavery and the spread of Islam in East Africa, especially Tanzania.

Becker's work has been supported by grants from the Gerda Henkel Foundation and the European Research Council. She won the Ellen MacArthur Prize in Economic History at Cambridge University.

Her books include:

References 

1971 births
Living people
21st-century Belgian historians
Historians of Africa
Historians of Tanzania
Academic staff of Ghent University
Fellows of Peterhouse, Cambridge
Historians of Islam
Belgian historians of religion
Historians of slavery
People from Erlangen